The 2012 WNBA season was the 16th season of the Women's National Basketball Association. The regular season began on May 18, 2012.

2011/2012 WNBA offseason
The new television deal with ESPN continued during the 2012 season (runs 2009–2016). For the first time ever, teams will be paid rights fees as part of this deal.
On January 3, 2012, the Tulsa Shock named former Indiana assistant coach Gary Kloppenburg head coach.
On January 5, 2012, the Los Angeles Sparks named former Atlanta assistant coach Carol Ross head coach.
The Seattle Storm trade three time WNBA champion Swin Cash to the Chicago Sky.
The New York Liberty will play home games for the next two seasons at Prudential Center in Newark, New Jersey, due to summer renovations at Madison Square Garden.

2012 WNBA Draft

The WNBA Draft lottery was held on November 10, 2011. The lottery teams were the Tulsa Shock, Minnesota Lynx (from Wash.), Chicago Sky and Los Angeles Sparks. The top pick was awarded to Los Angeles.

The 2012 WNBA Draft was held on April 16, 2012, in Bristol, Connecticut. Coverage of the first round was shown on ESPN (HD). Second and third round coverage was shown on ESPNU and NBA TV.

Regular season
Due to the 2012 Summer Olympics, there is no All-Star Game this season as the Olympiad causes a break from mid-July through August.

Standings

Playoffs and Finals

Season award winners

Player of the Week award

Player of the Month award

Rookie of the Month award

Postseason awards

Coaches

Eastern Conference
Atlanta Dream: Marynell Meadors and Fred Williams
Chicago Sky: Pokey Chatman
Connecticut Sun: Mike Thibault
Indiana Fever: Lin Dunn
New York Liberty: John Whisenant
Washington Mystics: Trudi Lacey

Western Conference
Los Angeles Sparks: Carol Ross
Minnesota Lynx: Cheryl Reeve
Phoenix Mercury: Corey Gaines
San Antonio Silver Stars: Dan Hughes
Seattle Storm: Brian Agler
Tulsa Shock: Gary Kloppenburg

See also
WNBA
WNBA Draft
WNBA All-Star Game
WNBA Playoffs
WNBA Finals

References

External links
Official Site

 
2012 in American women's basketball
2012–13 in American basketball by league
2011–12 in American basketball by league
Women's National Basketball Association seasons